This is a list of aestheticians, philosophers of art, who theorize about the nature of art and beauty.

Born before 17th century 
Abhinavagupta
Anandavardhana
Thomas Aquinas
Aristotle
Augustine of Hippo
Yusuf Balasagun
Liu Xie
Plato 
Plotinus

Born in the 17th or 18th century  

Yves Marie André
Georg Anton Friedrich Ast
Alexander Gottlieb Baumgarten
Jean Anthelme Brillat-Savarin
Edmund Burke
Victor Cousin
Jonathan Edwards
Alexander Gerard
Ferdinand Gotthelf Hand
Georg Wilhelm Friedrich Hegel
Johann Friedrich Herbart
Johann Gottfried Herder
François Hemsterhuis
David Hume
Francis Hutcheson
Immanuel Kant
Gotthold Ephraim Lessing
Thomas Reid
Friedrich Wilhelm Joseph von Schelling
Friedrich Schiller
August Wilhelm Schlegel
Karl Wilhelm Friedrich von Schlegel
Arthur Schopenhauer
Karl Wilhelm Ferdinand Solger
Johann Georg Sulzer
Tyagaraja

Born in the 19th century 

John Anderson
Victor Basch
Vissarion Belinsky
Clive Bell
Walter Benjamin
George Birkhoff
Georg Brandes
Ferruccio Busoni
R. G. Collingwood
Benedetto Croce
Arthur Danto
John Dewey
Ralph Waldo Emerson
Henri Focillon
Etienne Gilson
Edmund Gurney
Paul Häberlin
Eduard Hanslick
Hermann Theodor Hettner
Heinrich Gustav Hotho
Francis Ernest Jackson
Søren Kierkegaard (see Either/Or)
Susanne Langer
Vernon Lee
György Lukács
Jacques Maritain
Georg Mehlis
Theodor Mundt
Friedrich Nietzsche
Walter Pater
Edgar Allan Poe
David Prall
John Ruskin
George Santayana
Algernon Charles Swinburne
Tudor Vianu
Oscar Wilde

Born in the 20th century 

Theodor Adorno
Virgil Aldrich
Rudolf Arnheim
Sri Aurobindo
Jody Azzouni
Roland Barthes
Georges Bataille
Monroe Beardsley
Arnold Berleant
Max Black
Maurice Blanchot
Harold Bloom
Cesare Brandi
John Cage
Noël Carroll
Stanley Cavell
Gregory Currie
Jacques Derrida
William C. Dowling
Umberto Eco
Jerry Farber
Valentin Feldman
Michel Foucault
Hans-Georg Gadamer
Nelson Goodman
Garry Hagberg
John Hospers
Siri Hustvedt
Christopher Janaway
Mani Kaul
Andrzej Tadeusz Kijowski
Peter Kivy
Joseph Kosuth
Peter Lamarque
Jerrold Levinson
Li Zehou
Liu Gangji
Peter Lunenfeld
Jean-François Lyotard
John Maeda
André Malraux
Richard Meltzer
Michael Oakeshott
Luis Oyarzún
Ronald Paulson
Hans Pfitzner
Steven Poole
Ayn Rand
Roger Scruton
Calvin Seerveld
Richard Shusterman
Frank Sibley (philosopher)
Eli Siegel
Guy Sircello
Michael Sprinker
Peter Thielke
Iván Vitányi
Kendall Walton
Morris Weitz
William K. Wimsatt
Richard Wollheim

References 

Aesthetics